The 1961 All-Pacific Coast football team consists of American football players chosen by various organizations for All-Pacific Coast teams for the 1961 NCAA University Division football season.

Selections

Quarterbacks

 Terry Baker, Oregon State (AP-1)
 Pete Beathard, USC (BIG5-1)
 Chon Gallegos, San Jose State (AP-2)

Halfbacks

 Charlie Mitchell, Oregon (AP-1; BIG5-1)
 Bobby Smith, UCLA (AP-1; BIG5-1)
 Mike Haffner, UCLA (AP-2)
 Jim Stiger, Washington (AP-2)

Fullbacks

 Ben Wilson, USC (AP-1; BIG5-1)
 George Reed, Washington State (AP-2)

Ends

 Hugh Campbell, Washington State (AP-1)
 Oscar Donahue, San Jose State (AP-1)
 Hal Bedsole, USC (AP-2; BIG5-1)
 George Honore, Stanford (BIG5-1)
 Reg Carolan, Idaho (AP-2)
 Roger Johnson, Oregon State (AP-2)

Tackles

 John Meyers, Washington (AP-1; BIG5-1)
 Steve Barnett, Oregon (AP-1)
 Frank Buncom, USC (AP-2; BIG5-1)
 Foster Anderson, UCLA (AP-2)

Guards

 Britt Williams, USC (AP-1; BIG5-1)
 Mickey Ording, Oregon (AP-1)
 Jim Skaggs, Washington (AP-2; BIG5-1)
 Tom Walsh, Stanford (AP-2)

Centers

 Ron Hull, UCLA (AP-1; BIG5-1)
 Ray Mansfield, Washington (AP-2)

Key
AP = Associated Press

BIG5 = all-conference team announced by the league

Bold = Consensus first-team selection of both the UP and the Big 5 Conference

See also
1961 College Football All-America Team

References

All-Pacific Coast Football Team
All-Pacific Coast football teams
All-Pac-12 Conference football teams